Allochronic speciation (also known as allochronic isolation, or temporal isolation) is a form of speciation (specifically ecological speciation) arising from reproductive isolation that occurs due to a change in breeding time that reduces or eliminates gene flow between two populations of a species. The term allochrony is used to describe the general ecological phenomenon of the differences in phenology that arise between two or more species—speciation caused by allochrony is effectively allochronic speciation.

Environmental changes acting on a species population or populations can drive isolation. An important form of isolation is when populations are separated, not geographically, but temporally (by time). Genetic changes (mutations) over time can cause the two populations to differ—notably in phenology (events in a species life dictated by time such as breeding seasons); exhibiting unique phenotypes (the observable characteristics or traits of an organism).

Scientists have developed models to explain how this process occurs and how it is detected in natural populations. A wealth of studies exist regarding species in allochrony, with a select few that strongly suggest species are speciating or already have speciated as a direct consequence of this mode of isolation.

Model 

Speciation ultimately results due to the reproductive isolation between two populations. This can happen in a multitude of ways, a common mode of which is known as allopatric speciation. The geographic mode, where two species become physically isolated and unable to interbreed, allows for selection to act on both populations independently. Over time, this gives rise to a new species. Allochronic speciation is a form of isolation that can involve allopatry; however, it is not required.

Allochrony can involve a number of factors that induce the formation of a new species. Organisms have evolved various reproductive strategies (e.g. semelparity and iteroparity, single or multiple reproductive cycles in a lifetime) that can result in different outcomes for allochrony. Many organisms also breed at different times of the day, different seasons in the year, and even over multiple years or decades. Seasonal breeding in animals is a common occurrence as well as spawning (in aquatic animals) times. In plants, breeding in regards to time could involve the receptivity of the stigma (the female part of the flower) to accepting sperm, periods of pollen release (such as in conifer trees where male cones disperse pollen relying on wind to direct pollen to female cones), or the overall timing of flowering (based on possible environmental cues such as moisture levels, soil type or quality, temperature, or photoperiod). Even migratory patterns can play a role, as species may become isolated due to migrating at different times and to different locations. Climate change is considered to have a significant impact on allochrony—in particular, seasonal breeding species. Modeling changes in species breeding patterns due to climate as well as understanding the genetic mechanisms that control it has proven to be important.

Because of these many factors, slight to major changes in phenology can drive divergence between two populations. For example, a species with multiple breeding seasons in a year may shift those times depending on external conditions such as temperature or predation. In the event the populations (either allopatrically or sympatrically distributed, started breeding at different times, it would prevent members of each population from exchanging genes with one another. Over time, if genes are not exchanged, genetic differences arise in each population. If natural selection acts strongly on the two populations, they may become reproductively isolated, unable to reproduce viable, fertile offspring.

For allochronic speciation to be considered to have actually occurred, the model necessitates three major requirements:
 Phylogenetic analysis must indicate that the two taxa in question are incipient species or clearly sister taxa.
 Breeding timing is required to be genetically-based (heritable) as opposed to changeable throughout life (phenotypic plasticity.
 The source of divergence can be determined to be explicitly allochrony and not the result of reinforcement or other evolutionary mechanisms.

Allochrony is thought to evolve more easily the greater the heritability of reproductive timing—that is, the greater the link between genes and the timing of reproduction—the more likely speciation will occur. Allochrony can be non-genetic; however genetic factors must be involved for isolation to lead to complete reproductive isolation and subsequent speciation. The time frames involving allochrony are typically divided into three categories (prevalence in nature as well as examples are provided alongside each category):
 Daily (considered to be common), examples include stony corals such as Acropora or Orbicella.
 Seasonally (considered to be the most common), seasonal breeding times often coincide with winter, spring, fall, or summer; examples include salmon breeding runs such as in sockeye salmon. 
 Yearly (considered rarer), examples include periodical cicadas and bamboo, both of which reproduce within a scale of decades.

Population structures 

Other phenotypic traits are often found to co-occur with reproductive timing such as flowering number, egg-clutch sizes, reproductive lifespans, or body size—what can be defined as temporal phenotypic clines. Two explanations exist for the existence of these clines: phenotypic plasticity or phenotypic heritability (or possibly a combination of both). If plastic, the clines arise when certain phenotypic traits influence breeding time—such as reproducing at times when their traits are best suited or if conditions drive the expression of traits. If heritable, the same factors may be expressed as they are in a plastic explanation; however, gene flow limitations allow for adaptation to the specific conditions of the reproductive time. This means that, "an individual with a heritable tendency to reproduce early that instead reproduced late might express traits typical of early reproducers".

Isolation by time (IBT) is partially analogous to the concept of isolation by distance (IBD) wherein genetic differences between populations increase with spatial distance. When IBT is present in a population, the variation of natural selection during a breeding season causes adaptation by time (ABT) generating adaptive temporal variation in phenotypic traits. These two concepts are described in the following sections. Studies of salmonid fishes (involving reproductive lifespans, size at adulthood, age, energy storage, the mass of ovaries, egg sizes, number of eggs in a clutch, fecundity, and rates of development) and flowering plants (involving plant size, duration of flowing time, the number of flowers, the number of fruits, the timing of fruiting, and leaf size) have provided strong evidence of IBT leading to ABT as well as studies of yearly allochrony.

Isolation by time 
The concept of IBT warrants two probabilities: in the event that heritability in reproductive timing exists among populations that breed during different seasons, probability of mating will be, "inversely proportional to the difference in the heritable component of their reproductive times." The probability of mating can also be proportional to breeding values (phenotypic trait expressed as the trait of tis offspring) for reproductive time in the event the heritability is additive (more than one gene controls the phenotypic trait). In a population, offspring will inherit the traits for reproductive time causing a decrease in gene flow while reproductive timing differences increase.

Adaptation by time 
Adaptation by time is an extension of divergence due to limited gene flow between populations experiencing different selective pressures. Typically this is limited to spatial variation such as in ecological speciation; however, in allochrony, selection varies not just in space, but in reproductive time—giving rise to adaptive temporal clines in phenotypic traits that are heritable. Isolation by time effectively allows adaptive temporal clines to evolve as long as the reproductive season has selective variation. Evidence for adaptation by time demands four factors: 1) time restricts gene flow, 2) the reproductive season expresses variations in phenotypic traits, 3) temporal variation is controlled genetically (it is not plastic), and 4) temporal variation is adaptive. ABT increases, "as (i) selection on the trait increases; (ii) environmental influences on reproductive time decrease; (iii) the heritability of reproductive time increases; and (iv) the temporal distribution of reproductive activity becomes increasingly uniform."

Detecting allochrony 

Because allochronic speciation can occur in conjunction with other modes and forms of speciation, researchers must attempt to determine if the initial stages of isolation were the result of allochrony. The speciation continuum of allopatry, parapatry, and sympatry have all been implicated in studies of temporal isolation. Allochrony can also facilitate reinforcement after secondary contact. The frequency of allochronic speciation is thought to common but understudied as allochrony is widespread in nature.

Testing whether or not allochrony prevents gene flow can be difficult due to the multitude of unknown variables in wild populations and the inability to replicate and manipulate it in laboratory settings. Producing viable, and fertile offspring (or the lack thereof) is not always possible; fortunately, lake of mate tests do not necessarily indicate temporal isolation is not at play. As stated prior, one of the necessary criteria is that the species in question must be sister taxa (or demonstrably incipient). This means that accurate phylogenies are vital to determining the initial stage of a speciation event.

Despite the multitude of studies, it is not always evident whether allochrony is the sole driver of speciation or if other factors acting simultaneously are responsible. This can be more challenging when speciation has already occurred (in that the taxa in question are reproductively isolated and no longer incipient). Determining how important allochrony is as a historical cause of speciation can be tested by: 1) comparative studies that show the young pairs of sister taxa are temporally isolated and 2) testing cases of incipient species in sympatry where reproductive isolation is incomplete without temporal isolation.

Determining if allochrony is the source of divergence require a key pattern to be measured: isolation (and subsequently speciation) should correlate with a decrease in overlapping breeding times. This pattern indicates that daily allochrony is more prone to gene flow (closeness of breeding times can allow accidental intermixing of populations) while yearly allochrony is the least prone to gene flow (accidental intermixing is rare if large time frames exist between mating periods).

Examples of divergence driven by allochrony 
The following table documents cases of allochronic speciation. Varying degrees of certainty exist as not all cases strongly meet the three primary criteria necessitated by allochronic speciation. Species marked with an asterisk (*) indicate stronger confidence assessed by Rebecca Taylor and Vicki Friesen (2017).

Asynchrony of Seasons Hypothesis 
A noteworthy and significant pattern in nature is that of latitudinal gradients in species diversity. where species' richness (biodiversity) increases closer to Earth's equator. It is thought that one contributing factor is that rates of speciation are higher in these regions across the planet. The Asynchrony of Seasons Hypothesis is proposed to be a contributing factor to higher speciation rates as it relates directly to that of allochronic speciation. The hypothesis proposes that the pattern is a result of a lack of synchrony with seasonal variations in tropical regions.

In high-latitude regions, various taxa experience similar temperatures and solar radiation in cyclic patterns due to Earth's axial tilt—generating seasons that are not found at the equator. Because of this, populations of a species have phenologies that are generally synchronous across a range allowing for unimpeded dispersal and subsequent gene flow. This results in less divergence between populations; ultimately reducing rates of speciation (and overall biodiversity).

In contrast with this, latitudes near or at the equator (tropics) experience asynchrony in seasonal variation in that the regions receive similar amounts of solar radiation and maintain consistence temperature. What does change is precipitation patterns, as they can be sporadic, scattered, and vary over very short distances. This pattern causes asynchrony in the phenologies of species populations that can ultimately act as a temporally isolating barrier to reproduction. This prevents gene flow between populations and can drive divergence, speciation, and an increase in biodiversity.

A large scale test of the hypothesis was conducted on fifty-seven New World bird species across South, Central, and North America. The findings, using DNA, geographic and ecological distances, as well as climatic data, indicated that genetic differentiation increased in species populations where asynchrony in precipitation was present. A similar pattern was found in another study of forty-eight neotropical frogs.

References 

Speciation